Broken & Beautiful is the fifth album (fourth studio album) released by Contemporary Christian artist Mark Schultz. It was released on September 26, 2006.

Track listing 
All songs written by Mark Schultz, except where noted.

 "40 Days" (Schultz, Ben Glover) - 3:42
 "Broken & Beautiful" (Schultz, Matthew West) - 5:22
 "Walking Her Home" - 4:11
 "Until I See You Again" - 2:53
 "1000 Miles" - 2:59
 "Lord You Are" - 3:40
 "Everything to Me" (Schultz, Cindy Morgan) - 4:36
 "God of Life" (Schultz, Ian Eskelin) - 4:22
 "Now That You've Come Into My Life" - 3:11
 "She Was Watching" - 5:07
 "Until I See You Again" (Ballad Version) - 3:38

Personnel
 Mark Schultz – lead and backing vocals
 Shaun Shankel – keyboards (1, 2, 5, 6, 8, 9), programming (1, 2, 5, 6, 8, 9), arrangements (1, 2, 5, 6, 8, 9)
 Matt Rollings – acoustic piano (2, 5, 8)
 Tim Akers – keyboards (3, 4, 7, 10)
 Jimmy Nichols – keyboards (3, 4, 7, 10)
 Gordon Mote – acoustic piano (11)
 Rob Hawkins – guitars (1, 2, 6, 8, 9)
 Paul Moak – guitars (1, 2, 6)
 Tom Bukovac – guitars (2, 3, 4, 7-10)
 Akil Thompson – bass (1, 6)
 Craig Young – bass (2, 8, 9)
 Jimmie Lee Sloas – bass (3, 4, 7, 10)
 Ben Phillips – drums (1, 6)
 Shannon Forrest – drums (2, 8, 9)
 Chris McHugh – drums (3, 4, 7, 10)
 Eric Darken – percussion (3, 4, 7, 10) 
 Jonathan Yudkin – string arrangements (3, 4, 11), bass (3), cello (3, 11), viola (3, 11), violin (3, 11), strings (4), mandolin (11), arco bass (11)
 David Davidson – string arrangements (5)
 David Angell, Kristen Cassell, David Davidson, Jim Grosjean, Anthony LaMarchina, Pamela Sixfin, Elizabeth Stewart, Mary Kathryn Vanosdale and Kristen Wilkinson – strings (5)
 Ben Glover – backing vocals (2)
 Lisa Cochran – backing vocals (3, 4, 7, 10)
 Perry Coleman – backing vocals (3, 4, 7, 10)
 Joy Williams – backing vocals (8)

Production 
 Producers – Shaun Shankel (Tracks 1, 2, 5, 6, 8 & 9); Mark Bright (Tracks 3, 4, 7, 10 & 11).
 Executive Producer – Tim Marshall 
 A&R – Jamie Kiner
 Recording Engineers – Lee Bridges, Daewoo Kim, Shaun Shankel and Bill Whittington (Tracks 1, 2, 5, 6, 8 & 9); Derek Bason (Tracks 3, 4, 7, 10 & 11).
 Additional Recording on Tracks 3, 4, 7, 10 & 11 – J.R. Rodriguez 
 Assistant Engineers – Steve Lotz (Tracks 1, 2, 5, 6, 8 & 9); Chris Ashburn (Tracks 3, 4, 7, 10 & 11).
 Recorded at Sound Stage Studios, The Lealand House, The Smoakstack, Mono Y Mono, Bingham Bend, Bletchley Park,  Starstruck Studios and Jane’s Place (Nashville, TN); Little Big Sound (Bellevue, TN); The Castle (Franklin, TN).
 Mixing – F. Reid Shippen (Tracks 1, 2, 5, 6, 8 & 9); Derek Bason (Tracks 3, 4, 7 & 10); Ben Fowler (Track 11).
 Mixed at Starstruck Studios and The Rec Room (Nashville, TN).
 Digital Editing on Tracks 1, 2, 5, 6, 8 & 9 – Lee Bridges, Shaun Shankel and Bill Whittington.
 Tracks 1-10 mastered by Greg Calbi at Sterling Sound (New York, NY).
 Track 11 mastered by Hank Williams at MasterMix (Nashville, TN).
 Compiled by Randy LeRoy at Final Stage Mastering (Nashville, TN).
 Creative Director – Katherine Petillo
 Design – Bert Sumner at Ground Level Design (Franklin, TN).
 Photography – Michael Gomez
 Management – Lucid Artist Management

2007 re-release 
A second album called Broken and Beautiful: Expanded Edition was released on September 25, 2007. The album included all the songs on the new album, plus songs featured on WOW Hits. Also, the album contains a DVD with new music videos, and the origin of the song "Walking Her Home".

Reception

Commercial performance 
The album has currently sold over 300,000 copies nationwide.

Charts

Singles charts

Awards 

In 2007, the album was nominated for a Dove Award for Pop/Contemporary Album of the Year at the 38th GMA Dove Awards.

References 

Mark Schultz (musician) albums
2006 albums